Joseph Waldo Rice (1828–1915) was an American-born entrepreneur who was first person of European descent to settle the Moira Lakes region near Barmah, Victoria, Australia.  He was the proprietor of the Murray Fishing Company serving to provision prospectors and gold miners in the Bendigo region beginning in the early 1850s.

Early life and education
Joseph Waldo Rice was born on 8 February 1828, in Lincoln, Massachusetts to Henry Rice and Mary (Sherbourne) Rice.  After attending public schools in Lincoln, Massachusetts, he set out as prospector in the gold fields of California about 1850.  In 1853 with several colleagues from California, he chartered a vessel in San Francisco to sail for the gold fields of Bendigo, Australia.

Life and Career in Australia

Rice arrived in Victoria, Australia in 1853 to try his luck on the Australian gold fields near Bendigo. Rice died on 26 February 1915 in Moama, New South Wales,  and was buried in the Barmah Cemetery in Barma, Victoria along with his wife Mary Ann (Gill) Rice who died twenty years earlier on 21 October 1895. Many of his descendants still live in Barmah district.

Genealogy
Rice was a direct descendant of Edmund Rice, an early English immigrant to Massachusetts Bay Colony, as follows:

 Joseph Waldo Rice, son of
 Henry Rice (1794 – 1858), son of
 Gershom Rice (1755 – 1837), son of
 Gershom Rice (1710 – 1790), son of
 Jacob Rice (1660 – 1746), son of
 Edward Rice (1626 – 1712), son of
 Edmund Rice (1594 – 1663)

References

1915 deaths
1828 births
People from Lincoln, Massachusetts
American emigrants to Australia
19th-century Australian businesspeople